Joshikō (girl's high school) is Japanese mystery suspense film written and directed by  and starring Minami Minegishi. It was released on April 9, 2016.

Cast
Minami Minegishi as Katsuki Takahashi
Riho Takada as Mifuyu Tachibana
 as Natsumi Shirakawa
Erina Nakayama as Takako Minefuji
 as Erika Uchida
Ayana Sōgawa as Arisa Kida
 as Yuka Kawasaki
Ami Tomite as Aki Yazawa
Taiyo Ayukawa 
Ryohei Abe
Toru Kazama
Ruika
Ryutaro Maeda

Production
The theme song of the film is "Higurashi no Naku Koro ni feat.

References

External links
 

2016 films
Japanese mystery films
2010s mystery films
2010s Japanese films